The 2013 Tulane Green Wave football team represented Tulane University in the 2013 NCAA Division I FBS football season. They were led by second year head coach Curtis Johnson and played home games at the Mercedes-Benz Superdome. They were a member of Conference USA in the West Division. This was the Green Wave's last season playing in the Superdome and Conference USA as they will open the new, on-campus Yulman Stadium in the fall of 2014, and move to the American Athletic Conference in July 2014. They finished the season 7–6, 5–3 in C-USA play to finish in fourth place in the West Division. They were invited to the New Orleans Bowl where they lost to Louisiana–Lafayette.

In the 2013 season, Tulane reached 500 program wins, had its first winning record since 2002, and went to its first bowl game since the 2002 Hawaii Bowl.

Pre-season

Recruits

Award watch lists
 Orleans Darkwa – Doak Walker Award Candidate (3rd consecutive year)
Ryan Grant – Fred Biletnikoff Award Watch List
Cairo Santos – Lou Groza Award Watch List (2012 award winner)

C-USA All-Conference Preseason Awards
Cairo Santos – Special Teams Player of the Year
Ryan Grant – First Team, Offense
Lorenzo Doss – First Team, Defense
Cairo Santos – First Team, Special Teams

Roster

Schedule

x- *(Tape Delayed broadcast )
Source

Game summaries

Jackson State

This was the first meeting in football between Tulane and Jackson State.

South Alabama

This was the first meeting in football between Tulane and South Alabama.

Louisiana Tech

Tulane last played Louisiana Tech during its undefeated 1998 season, winning 63–30 at home.  Tulane has never lost to Louisiana Tech in football.

Syracuse

Louisiana-Monroe

Orleans Darkwa led the team with 118 rushing yards, and the defense held their opponent scoreless in the first half for the second time in the season. Tulane forced 5 turnovers in the game and outgained ULM in rushing yards by 253 to 26.

North Texas

This was the first meeting in football between Tulane and North Texas. Tulane won as time expired on the clock with a 27-yard field goal from Lou Groza Award-winner Cairo Santos. It was Tulane's first homecoming victory since the 2006 season and gave the Green Wave its best season start since 2003 and best conference start since 1998. The victory was also Tulane football's 500th win all-time. The defense held their opponent scoreless in the first half for the third time in the season and had two interceptions. Special teams blocked a punt and returned it for a touchdown for the first time in school history.

East Carolina

Devin Powell played quarterback for Tulane, as starting quarterback Nick Montana was out with a shoulder injury. Cairo Santos kicked 5 field goals, including a 42-yard kick to win the game in triple overtime. Derrick Strozier intercepted an East Carolina pass and returned it 99 yards for a touchdown, while wearing one shoe. The game was the longest in school history and Tulane's first win over East Carolina since 2003. Following the victory, Tulane players won all three Conference USA weekly awards: Offensive Player of the Week (Devin Powell), Defensive Player of the Week (Derrick Strozier), and Special Teams Player of the Week (Cairo Santos).

Tulsa

Tulane came away with a 14–7 victory, beating Tulsa for the first time since their initial meeting in 1968, a 25–15 Green Wave victory in Tulane Stadium. In the two teams' last 8 meetings, the Green Wave lost by an average score of 43–12. Tulane forced 4 turnovers and 8 penalties from a Tulsa team that was the least penalized in college football coming into the game. The Golden Hurricane managed only 7 points in a game for the first time since their season opener against Bowling Green. Devin Powell played quarterback in place of Nick Montana, who was still on the bench with a separated shoulder. With the win, Tulane became bowl-eligible for the first time since 2002.

Florida Atlantic

This was the first meeting in football between Tulane and Florida Atlantic.

UTSA

This was the first meeting in football between Tulane and UTSA. While the Green Wave compiled more yards and first downs than the Roadrunners, while holding the ball for 15 minutes more, the team committed 14 penalties for 105 yards. UTSA kicked a field goal with 14 seconds remaining on the clock to break the 7–7 tie and win the game. With the loss, Tulane dropped to 6–4.

UTEP

Tulane dominated UTEP in the program's final scheduled home game in the Superdome, scoring 38 points in the first half alone. Numerous former players from the Superdome era attended the game, and the "All-Dome Team," an all-star team of players from those 38 seasons, was introduced at halftime. The Green Wave's 45–3 victory was the largest margin of victory for Tulane in a C-USA game, and the 3 points allowed were the fewest the program had ever allowed in a C-USA contest. The win brought Tulane's record to 7–4, ensuring its first winning season since 2002. The Green Wave offense totaled 482 yards, with 205 passing and 277 rushing. The defense allowed 232 yards total and forced 3 turnovers. The team also reduced its penalties from the previous game to 4, totaling 35 yards. The win kept Tulane in contention to win the West Division of C-USA, provided it gained a victory at Rice the next week, while UTSA lost to Louisiana Tech at home.

Rice

This was the last conference game between Tulane and Rice. The Green Wave defense continued its above-average season by holding Rice's conference-best offense to 124 rushing yards, less than half its average coming into the game. It also forced two turnovers to place the Wave in position to score a field goal in the first half and a touchdown in the second half. The defensive effort could not make up for Tulane's offense, however, which struggled throughout the game and gained a season-low 123 yards, scoring only 3 points in the first half.

Louisiana–Lafayette–New Orleans Bowl

This was Tulane's first bowl game since its 36–28 Hawaii Bowl win over Hawaii in 2002. It was also the first all-Louisiana New Orleans Bowl game.

After the season

Awards

C-USA All-Conference Awards

Ryan Grant – First Team, Offense
Lorenzo Doss – First Team, Defense
Julius Warmsley – First Team, Defense
Cairo Santos – First Team, Special Teams

Nico Marley – co-Freshman Player of the Year
Orleans Darkwa – Honorable Mention, Offense
Sean Donnelly – Honorable Mention, Offense
Zach Morgan – Honorable Mention, Offense

Chris Davenport – Honorable Mention, Defense
Royce LaFrance – Honorable Mention, Defense
Jordan Batiste – Honorable Mention, Defense
Darion Monroe – Honorable Mention, Defense

References

Tulane
Tulane Green Wave football seasons
Tulane Green Wave football